Tino Thömel (born 6 June 1988) is a German former professional road cyclist, who most recently worked as a directeur sportif for UCI Continental team .

Thömel had eight professional wins in his career, as well as several more at lower levels. Three of his wins came in the Szlakiem Grodów Piastowskich cycling race in Poland, with one stage win each in 2011, 2012 and 2013. He also won a stage of the 2014 Tour of China and a stage of the 2015 Tour de Taiwan.

Major results 

2009
 8th Overall Tour de Berlin
2010
 1st Rund um den Finanzplatz Eschborn-Frankfurt U23
 Tour of Alanya
1st Stages 1 & 4
 3rd Overall Tour du Loir-et-Cher
 3rd Overall Tour de Berlin
1st Stages 1 (TTT) & 2
2011
 1st Stage 3 Szlakiem Grodów Piastowskich
 Tour of Greece
1st Stages 1 & 6
 1st Stage 1 Oberösterreich Rundfahrt
 1st Stage 8 Tour de Normandie
 5th Neuseen Classics
 10th ProRace Berlin
2012
 1st Stage 3 Szlakiem Grodów Piastowskich
 2nd Gooikse Pijl
 3rd Kernen Omloop Echt-Susteren
 4th De Kustpijl
2013
 1st Overall Tour du Loir-et-Cher
1st Stages 1, 3 & 5
 1st Stage 3 Szlakiem Grodów Piastowskich
 1st Stage 6 Tour de Normandie
 2nd Kernen Omloop Echt-Susteren
 10th Ster van Zwolle
2014
 1st Stage 6 Tour of China I
 5th Arno Wallaard Memorial
 8th Overall Tour of China II
2015
 1st Stage 5 Tour de Taiwan
 1st Stage 8 Tour de Korea
 1st Stage 7 Tour of Hainan
 9th Overall Tour of Yancheng Coastal Wetlands
1st Stage 2
2016
 1st Stage 2 Tour of China II
2017
 1st Stage 3 Tour of Ukraine

References

External links 

German male cyclists
1988 births
Living people
Directeur sportifs
Cyclists from Berlin